Schondorf (Bay) station is a railway station in the municipality of Schondorf, in Bavaria, Germany. It is located on the Mering–Weilheim line of Deutsche Bahn.

Services
 the following services stop at Schondorf (Bay):

References

External links
 
 Schondorf (Bay) layout 
 

Railway stations in Bavaria
Buildings and structures in Landsberg (district)